Domingo Muñoz Cuesta (1850, Madrid - 9 August 1935, Madrid) was a Spanish painter and illustrator; best known for genre scenes and historical period pieces, mostly on military themes.

Biography 
He received his artistic instruction at the "  Special School of Painting, Sculpture and Engraving", a satellite school of the Real Academia de Bellas Artes de San Fernando. His primary instructor there was Francisco Domingo Marqués. During the 1880s, he studied at various schools in Rome. 

He won an award in a contest sponsored by the latter.

Later, he participated in exhibits at the "Sociedad La Acuarela" (watercolors), Círculo de Bellas Artes, and at the Hernández Galleries. He also did illustrations for the edition of Gil Blas de Santillana, published by the Casa Editorial La Maravilla.

He was married to the painter, María Luisa de la Riva.

References

Further reading
 "El pintor Domingo Muñoz ha fallecido" (obituary) Heraldo de Madrid, 9 January 1935 Online

External links

More works by Muñoz @ ArtNet

1850 births
1935 deaths
Spanish painters
Spanish genre painters
Spanish illustrators
Artists from Madrid